Korha Assembly constituency is an assembly constituency in Katihar district in the Indian state of Bihar. It is reserved for scheduled castes.

Overview
As per Delimitation of Parliamentary and Assembly constituencies Order, 2008, No 69. Korha Assembly constituency (SC) is composed of the following: Korha and Falka community development blocks.

Korha Assembly constituency is part of No 12 Purnia (Lok Sabha constituency).

Members of Legislative Assembly

Election results

2020

References

External links
 

Assembly constituencies of Bihar
Politics of Katihar district